The 2017 Ford EcoBoost 300 was the 33rd and final stock car race of the 2017 NASCAR Xfinity Series season, the Championship 4 race, and the 23rd iteration of the event. The race was held on Saturday, November 18, 2017, in Homestead, Florida at Homestead–Miami Speedway, a  permanent oval-shaped racetrack. The race took the scheduled 134 laps to complete. At race's end, Cole Custer, driving for Stewart-Haas Racing, would dominate the race to take his first career NASCAR Xfinity Series victory and his only victory of the season. 

Meanwhile, third-place finisher, JR Motorsports driver William Byron would win his only NASCAR Xfinity Series championship after battling with teammate Elliott Sadler, passing Sadler with nine to go using the car of Ryan Preece to pass Sadler for the championship.

Background 

Homestead-Miami Speedway is a motor racing track located in Homestead, Florida. The track, which has several configurations, has promoted several series of racing, including NASCAR, the Verizon IndyCar Series, the Grand-Am Rolex Sports Car Series and the Championship Cup Series.

Since 2002, Homestead-Miami Speedway has hosted the final race of the season in all three of NASCAR's series: the Sprint Cup Series, Xfinity Series and Gander Outdoors Truck Series. Ford Motor Company sponsors all three of the season-ending races; the races have the names Ford EcoBoost 400, Ford EcoBoost 300 and Ford EcoBoost 200, respectively, and the weekend is marketed as Ford Championship Weekend. The Xfinity Series (then known as the Busch Series) has held its season-ending races at Homestead since 1995 and held it until 2020, when it was moved to Phoenix Raceway, along with NASCAR's other two series.

Championship drivers 

 Justin Allgaier advanced by virtue of points.
 William Byron advanced by winning the 2017 Ticket Galaxy 200.
 Daniel Hemric advanced by virtue of points.
 Elliott Sadler advanced by virtue of points.

Entry list

Practice

First practice 
The first practice session was held on Friday, November 17, at 2:30 PM EST. The session would last for 55 minutes.

Second and final practice 
The final practice session, sometimes known as Happy Hour, was held on Friday, November 17, at 5:00 PM EST. The session would last for 55 minutes.

Qualifying 
Qualifying was held on Saturday, November 11, at 11:15 AM EST. Since Homestead–Miami Speedway is under  in length, the qualifying system was a multi-car system that included three rounds. The first round was 15 minutes, where every driver would be able to set a lap within the 15 minutes. Then, the second round would consist of the fastest 24 cars in Round 1, and drivers would have 10 minutes to set a lap. Round 3 consisted of the fastest 12 drivers from Round 2, and the drivers would have 5 minutes to set a time. Whoever was fastest in Round 3 would win the pole.

Three drivers would fail to qualify: Quin Houff, Matt Mills, and Morgan Shepherd.

Full qualifying results

Race results 

 Note: Justin Allgaier, William Byron, Daniel Hemric, and Elliott Sadler are not eligible for stage points because of their participation in the Championship 4.

Stage 1 Laps: 45

Stage 2 Laps: 45

Stage 3 Laps: 110

Standings after the race 

Drivers' Championship standings

Note: Only the first 12 positions are included for the driver standings.

References 

2017 NASCAR Xfinity Series
NASCAR races at Homestead-Miami Speedway
November 2017 sports events in the United States
2017 in sports in Florida